In enzymology, a N-methyl-2-oxoglutaramate hydrolase is an enzyme that catalyzes the chemical reaction

N-methyl-2-oxoglutaramate + H2O  2-oxoglutarate + methylamine

Thus, the two substrates of this enzyme are N-methyl-2-oxoglutaramate and H2O, whereas its two products are 2-oxoglutarate and methylamine.

This enzyme belongs to the family of hydrolases, those acting on carbon-nitrogen bonds other than peptide bonds, specifically in linear amides.  The systematic name of this enzyme class is N-methyl-2-oxoglutaramate methylamidohydrolase. This enzyme is also called 5-hydroxy-N-methylpyroglutamate synthase.

References

 
 

EC 3.5.1
Enzymes of unknown structure